The Elizabeth River Bridge is a road bridge which crosses Elizabeth River about  south of the Darwin city centre, in the Northern Territory of Australia.

The bridge carries the Channel Island Road over the river from the suburb of Archer to the locality of Wickham. The bridge was established as part of the infrastructure works associated with the Channel Island Power Station.

During the 2001-2002 financial year, its width was increased to accommodate the Adelaide-Darwin railway.

References

External links

Bridges completed in the 20th century
Road bridges in the Northern Territory
Railway bridges in Australia
1980s establishments in Australia
Concrete bridges in Australia